Joseph Barber Lightfoot (13 April 1828 – 21 December 1889), known as J. B. Lightfoot, was an English theologian and Bishop of Durham.

Life
Lightfoot was born in Liverpool, where his father John Jackson Lightfoot was an accountant. His mother, Ann Matilda Barber, was from a family of Birmingham artists. He was educated at King Edward's School, Birmingham, under James Prince Lee.  His contemporaries included Brooke Foss Westcott and Edward White Benson. In 1847, Lightfoot went to Trinity College, Cambridge, and read for his degree along with Westcott. He graduated senior classic and 30th wrangler, and was elected a fellow of his college. From 1854 to 1859 he edited the Journal of Classical and Sacred Philology. In 1857, he became tutor and his fame as a scholar grew. He was made Hulsean professor in 1861, and shortly afterwards chaplain to the Prince Consort and honorary chaplain in ordinary to Queen Victoria.

In 1866, he was Whitehall preacher, and in 1871 he became canon of St Paul's Cathedral. The Times wrote after his death that

In 1875, Lightfoot became Lady Margaret's Professor of Divinity in succession to William Selwyn. In 1879, he was consecrated bishop of Durham in succession to Charles Baring; he was enthroned at Durham Cathedral on 15 May. He soon surrounded himself with a band of scholarly young men.

Lightfoot was never married. He died at Bournemouth and was succeeded in the episcopate by Westcott, his schoolfellow and lifelong friend. He served as President of the first day of the 1880 Co-operative Congress.

He is buried in Durham Cathedral close to the choir stalls.

Work
Lightfoot wrote commentaries on the Epistle to the Galatians (1865), Epistle to Philippians (1868) and Epistle to the Colossians (1875). In 1874, the anonymous publication of Supernatural Religion, a skeptical work by Walter Richard Cassels, attracted much attention. In a series of rebuttals published in the Contemporary Review, between December 1874 and May 1877, Lightfoot undertook the defense of the New Testament canon. The articles were published in collected form in 1889. About the same time he was engaged in contributions to William Smith's Dictionary of Christian Biography and Dictionary of the Bible, and he also joined the committee for revising the translation of the New Testament.
 
The corpus of Lightfoot's writings include essays on biblical and historical subject matter, commentaries on Pauline epistles, and studies on the Apostolic Fathers. His sermons were posthumously published in four official volumes, and additionally in the Contemporary Pulpit Library series. At Durham he continued to work at his editions of the Apostolic Fathers, and in 1885 published an edition of the Epistles of Ignatius and Polycarp, collecting also materials for a second edition of Clement of Rome, which was published after his death (1st ed., 1869). He defended the authenticity of the Epistles of Ignatius.

Lightfoot had said that he was open to the idea of a diaconate that included women and in 1899 Emily Marshall wrote A Suggestion for our Times on this theme. Marshall said she was told by Lightfoot to give her idea of training women in his diocese, to take on this role, "a practical form". Lightfoot's death resulted in her idea being shut down. Marshall created a new religious order within the church based on Lightfoot's discussion of the Third Order of Saint Francis who had historically consisted of men and women who did not live in monasteries or wear cowls. Marshall however regretted that diaconate idea had been lost due to his death.

In 2014, it was announced that InterVarsity Press had agreed to publish about 1500 pages of previously unpublished biblical commentaries and essays by Lightfoot found in Durham Cathedral. The first of the three volume set covers the Acts of the Apostles, the second is a commentary on the Gospel of John and the third is on the Second Epistle to the Corinthians and the First Epistle of Peter.

Family
Lightfoot was the nephew of the artists Joseph Vincent Barber and Charles Vincent Barber and grandson of the artist and founding member of the Birmingham School of Art, Joseph Barber and great grandson of the founder of Newcastle's first library, Joseph Barber whose tomb is in Newcastle Cathedral.

Bibliography

References

Sources

External links
 
 
 
 
 
 Bibliographic page on Lightfoot, Project Canterbury
 

1828 births
1889 deaths
Evangelical Anglican biblical scholars
Evangelical Anglican bishops
Evangelical Anglican theologians
English evangelicals
Clergy from Liverpool
English Christian theologians
English Anglican theologians
British biblical scholars
New Testament scholars
British historians of religion
People educated at King Edward's School, Birmingham
Alumni of Trinity College, Cambridge
Bishops of Durham
19th-century Church of England bishops
Presidents of Co-operative Congress
English sermon writers
Hulsean Professors of Divinity
English male non-fiction writers
Anglican biblical scholars
Lady Margaret's Professors of Divinity
19th-century Anglican theologians